Geranium argenteum, the silvery crane's bill, is an ornamental plant in the family Geraniaceae, which is native to Europe.

References

External links

argenteum
Flora of Europe